Calvary was a station on the Chicago Rapid Transit Company's Evanston Line, now the Chicago Transit Authority's Purple Line. The station was located at 400 Chicago Avenue, across from the entrance to Calvary Cemetery. Calvary opened on May 16, 1908, and closed in 1931; it was replaced by South Boulevard. After its closure, Calvary remained boarded and abandoned for seven decades before being demolished in February 1995.

References

Defunct Chicago "L" stations
Railway stations in Evanston, Illinois
Railway stations in the United States opened in 1908
Railway stations closed in 1931
1908 establishments in Illinois
1931 disestablishments in Illinois
Funeral transport